Audrey Azoulay (born 4 August 1972) is a French civil servant and politician who has been serving as the Director-General of the United Nations Educational, Scientific and Cultural Organization (UNESCO) since 2017, becoming the second female leader of the organization. She previously served as France's Minister of Culture in the government of Prime Minister Manuel Valls from 2016 to 2017.

Early life and education

Early life and family 
Azoulay was born in La Celle-Saint-Cloud to a Moroccan Jewish family from Essaouira. Her father, André Azoulay, is the current adviser to king Mohammed VI of Morocco, having previously been the adviser to his predecessor Hassan II from 1991 to 1999. Her mother, Katia Brami, is a Moroccan writer. Her aunt, Éliane Azoulay, is a journalist for the French magazine "Télérama". She indicates having "grown up in a very left-wing environment"," politicized on the Israeli-Palestinian conflict", in the Beaugrenelle neighborhood, with her two older sisters, Judith, who worked in the "Association française d'action artistique" (AFAA) and Sabrina, who is a producer.

Education 

Azoulay gained a master's degree in management sciences from Paris Dauphine University in 1994 and a master's degree in business administration from Lancaster University. She also studied at Sciences Po and the École nationale d'administration (ENA) in 2000 ( promotion Averroès, alongside Fleur Pellerin, Alexis Kohler and Nicolas Kazadi among others).

Activism and political orientation 
During her university studies, Azoulay worked at a bank, which she says she "hated". During her studies in the École Nationale d'Administration, she says she "discovered the old French anti-Semitism".

Azoulay recalled having participated in demonstrations against the Devaquet bill in 1986 and against the Juppé plan in 1995, and against the candidature of Jean-Marie Le Pen in the second round of the 2002 French presidential election. Her role models are Simone Veil and Jean Zay.

Career

Career in the public sector
In 2000, Azoulay was appointed civil administrator, assigned to the general secretariat of Prime Minister Lionel Jospin's government. From April 2000 to July 2003, she worked as the head of the public audiovisual sector office, especially for the strategy and the funding of sector organizations in the media development department. At the same time, she manages media expertise missions for the European Commission within the process of pre-accession programs.

In 2003, Azoulay was in charge of the conference on media strategy, audiovisual and cinema financing at Sciences Po. From September 2003 to February 2006, she worked for the Ile-de-France Regional Chamber Accounts and with the committee for inquiry into the cost and performance of public service. In 2004, she appeared in the distribution of the film "Le Grand Rôle" by the director Steve Suissa, where she played the director's assistant.

In 2006, Azoulay joined the National Center of Cinematography and the moving image (CNC), successively holding the positions of Deputy Director for Multimedia Affairs, Chief Financial and Legal Officer and Deputy Director-General.

From 2014 until 2016, Azoulay served as an advisor on communications and cultural affairs to President François Hollande.

Minister of Culture
Azoulay succeeded Fleur Pellerin as Minister of Culture on 11 February 2016. During her time in office, she increased her department's budget by 6.6% to a total of €2.9 billion in 2017 – the largest amount of government money promised for the arts in the country's history. Under her leadership, the Ministry lent support to a women's contemporary art prize launched by AWARE (Archives of Women Artists, Research and Exhibitions). Internationally, she played a key role in the joint initiatives of France, the UNESCO and the United Arab Emirates to safeguard cultural heritage in conflict zones, announced in December 2016, and was a signatory to the Florence Declaration condemning the destruction of cultural sites at the first G7 culture summit in March 2017. On 24 March 2017, she presented Draft Resolution 2347 on the protection of cultural heritage in armed conflicts to the UN Security Council. This resolution, put forward by France, Italy and UNESCO, was adopted unanimously.

By the end of 2016, Azoulay eventually decided against becoming a candidate herself in the 2017 French legislative election. In the Socialist Party's presidential primaries, she endorsed Manuel Valls as the party's candidate for the 2017 French presidential election. After the Socialist Party was eliminated in the first round of the election, she publicly declared her support for Emmanuel Macron against Marine Le Pen.

Director-General of UNESCO
In 2017, Azoulay was one of the nine candidates seeking to succeed Irina Bokova as Director-General of UNESCO. In the final round against Hamad Bin Abdulaziz Al-Kawari, she was elected as Director-General of UNESCO, and her candidacy was presented for approval at UNESCO's general assembly on 10 November 2017. In 2021, Azoulay was elected to a second four-year term.

Other activities 
 Generation Unlimited, Member of the Board (since 2018)
 Joint United Nations Programme on HIV/AIDS (UNAIDS), Ex-Officio Member of the Committee of Cosponsoring Organizations (since 2017)
 International Gender Champions (IGC), Member

Personal life
Azoulay has a son and a daughter with her husband François-Xavier Labarraque, who also studied at the École nationale d'administration. Unlike her parents, she is not a Moroccan national.

References

External links
 Audrey Azoulay's website as Candidate for Director-General for UNESCO

|-

1972 births
21st-century French politicians
21st-century French women politicians
École nationale d'administration alumni
21st-century French Jews
French Ministers of Culture
French people of Moroccan-Jewish descent
Living people
Paris Dauphine University alumni
Politicians from Paris
Sciences Po alumni
Women government ministers of France
Commandeurs of the Ordre des Arts et des Lettres
UNESCO Directors-General
People from Yvelines